The 2004 African Judo Championships were the 25th edition of the African Judo Championships, and were held in Tunis, Tunisia from 7 May to 8 May 2004.

Medal overview

Men

Women

Medals table

References

External links
 
 2004 African Judo Championships results (International Judo Federation)

A
Judo Championships
African Judo Championships, 2004
African Judo Championships
International sports competitions hosted by Tunisia
Judo competitions in Tunisia
May 2004 sports events in Africa